Floyd Cooper (January 8, 1956July 15, 2021) was an American illustrator of children's books. He was based in Easton, Pennsylvania and has worked with Jane Yolen, Nikki Grimes, Eloise Greenfield, Howard Bryant, Joyce Carol Thomas, Bill Martin Jr and many more. He graduated from the University of Oklahoma.

Personal
Floyd grew up in low income housing, in Tulsa, OK. In school his teacher's began to notice his illustrations and submitted his work to a scholarship committee. After Graduating from The University of Oklahoma, Floyd began to work for Hallmark Cards in Kansas City. He later moved to Manhattan where he struggled before he got his first contract with Penguin Books Floyd's first illustrated book was published in 1988 and written by Eloise Greenfield.

Awards
Floyd was awarded a Coretta Scott King Illustrator Award, for The Blacker the Berry a Coretta Scott King Award Illustrator Honor, a Golden Kite Award for A Dance Like Starlight: One Ballerina’s Dream. and a Charlotte Zolotow Award  for Max and the Tag-Along Moon written by Floyd himself.

Selected works

Max and the Tag-Along Moon by Floyd Cooper (2013)
The Blacker the Berry by Joyce Carol Thomas (2008)
Grandpa's Face by Eloise Greenfield (1988)
Jump! From the Life of Michael Jordan by Floyd Cooper (2004)
Brown Honey in Broomwheat Tea by Joyce Carol Thomas (1993)
I Have Hear of a Land by Joyce Carol Thomas (1998)
Caddie the Golf Dog by Michael Sampson and Bill Martin Jr (2002)
The Ring Bearer by Floyd Cooper (2017)
Juneteenth for Mazie by Floyd Cooper (2015)
Coming Home: From the Life of Langston Hughes by Floyd Cooper (1994)
Meet Danitra Brown by Nikki Grimes (1994)
Sisters and Champions: The True Story of Venus and Serena Williams by Howard Bryant (2018)
A Dance Like Starlight by Kristy Dempsey (2014)
Laura Charlotte by Kathryn O. Galbraith (1990)
These Hands 
Ruth and the Green Book 
Ben and the Emancipation Proclamation
Brick by Brick

References

1956 births
Living people
African-American literature
American illustrators
University of Oklahoma alumni